The  St. John the Baptist Cathedral also Ciudad Altamirano Cathedral is a cathedral of the Catholic Church located in Ciudad Altamirano, Guerrero, Mexico, and is considered one of the most important religious monuments in the state built during the sixteenth century.

It serves as the mother church of the Diocese of Ciudad Altamirano, created by Pope Paul VI in 1964 through the bull "Populo Dei". It is under the pastoral responsibility of Bishop Maximino Martínez Miranda.

See also
Roman Catholicism in Mexico
St. John the Baptist

References

Roman Catholic cathedrals in Mexico